Piton Sainte-Rose is a village located on the eastern coast of the French island and department of Réunion in the Indian Ocean. It is part of the commune of Sainte-Rose.

History 
In April 1977, Piton Sainte-Rose was devastated by a lava flow from the Piton de la Fournaise, the active volcano of the island. The village church was partly invaded by the lava flow but not destroyed. The church was subsequently restored and renamed Notre Dame des Laves (Our Lady of the Lava). It is used for catholic services.

References 

Populated places in Réunion